Sabak Bernam may refer to:
Sabak Bernam District
Sabak Bernam (federal constituency), represented in the Dewan Rakyat
Sabak Bernam (state constituency), formerly represented in the Selangor State Council (1955–59)